Lichfield is a city in Staffordshire, England.

Lichfield may also refer to:

Associated with the English city
 Lichfield Cathedral
 Lichfield City railway station
 Lichfield Trent Valley railway station
 Lichfield (district), a local government district 
 Lichfield (UK Parliament constituency)
 Lichfield and Tamworth (UK Parliament constituency)
 Earl of Lichfield, a peerage
 Countess of Lichfield (disambiguation), including a list of women who have held the title
 Lichfield Canal
 Lichfield Cricket Club
 Lichfield Gospels, an eighth century book of the Gospels
 Diocese of Lichfield
 Archdeacon of Lichfield
 Bishop of Lichfield
 Dean of Lichfield, including a list of people who have held the title

People
 Nathaniel Lichfield (1916–2009), British urban and environmental planner
 Paul W. Litchfield (1875–1959), American inventor, industrialist, and author
 Richard Lichfield (died 1630), British surgeon
 Patrick Anson, 5th Earl of Lichfield (1939–2005), English photographer
 Thomas Lichfield (died 1586), English politician

Other uses
 Lichfield, New Zealand, a New Zealand settlement named after the English city
 HMS Lichfield, several ships
 RAF Lichfield, in Fradley, Staffordshire, England

See also

 Lichfield House (disambiguation)
 Litchfield (disambiguation)
 
 Litch (disambiguation)
 Lich (disambiguation)